Girl Illustrated was a glamour magazine published in London, England from 1966 to 1977. It was a spin-off of the naturist magazine Health & Efficiency and was notable for its high quality paper and numerous colour photographs.

Katy Manning appeared naked with a Dalek prop in a 1978 issue.

References

Celebrity magazines published in the United Kingdom
Defunct women's magazines published in the United Kingdom
Magazines published in London
Magazines established in 1966
Magazines disestablished in 1977